National Highway 717B, commonly referred to as NH 717B is a national highway in  India. It is a secondary  spur road of National Highway 17. NH-717B traverses the state of Sikkim in India.

Route 
NH717B connects Rhenock, Rongli, Zuluk, chujenpheri and Menla, Sherathang in the state of Sikkim.

Junctions  

  Terminal near Rhenock.
  Terminal near Menla, Sherathang.

See also 

 List of National Highways in India
 List of National Highways in India by state
 National Highway 717A (India)

References

External links 
 NH 717B on OpenStreetMap

National highways in India
National Highways in Sikkim